Dickson Glacier is located in Torres del Paine National Park of southern Chile. Geologically it is in the southeastern outflow from the Southern Patagonian Ice Field.

See also
Grey Glacier
Southern Patagonian Ice Field
List of glaciers

References

External links
General information about Dickson glacier in Glaciologia.cl 

Glaciers of Magallanes Region
Torres del Paine National Park